Gorgo al Monticano is a comune (municipality) in the Province of Treviso in the Italian region Veneto, located about  northeast of Venice and about  northeast of Treviso.

Gorgo al Monticano borders the following municipalities: Chiarano, Mansuè, Meduna di Livenza, Motta di Livenza, Oderzo, Pasiano di Pordenone.

References

Cities and towns in Veneto